Sebastien Grimaldi (born 10 September 1979 in Givors, Rhône) is a French footballer who plays primarily as a centre back, though can play in midfield.

Grimaldi began his career with Saint-Romain en gier. In 1992, he moved to Oullins where he stayed until 1995 when he joined the academy of Olympique Lyonnais.

In 2000, Grimaldi moved to Cannes and in 2002 to Angers. He moved to Belgium to play for Excelsior Mouscron in 2005.

He joined Chesterfield on 31 January 2007, making his debut on 3 February 2007 in a 1–0 defeat at home to AFC Bournemouth. He impressed at Saltergate, but unfortunately an injury meant he left the club in the summer of 2007.

In July 2008, he joined APOP Kinyras Peyias with which on 17 May 2009 he won the Cypriot Cup 2008-09. He had a very good game in final.
Actually he is one of the best defender in the Cypriot First Division.

Honours 
 Cypriot Cup: 2008–09

References

External links

1979 births
Living people
People from Givors
Sportspeople from Lyon Metropolis
French footballers
French expatriate footballers
Olympique Lyonnais players
AS Cannes players
Angers SCO players
Royal Excel Mouscron players
Chesterfield F.C. players
AS Saint-Priest players
APOP Kinyras FC players
Ligue 1 players
French expatriate sportspeople in Belgium
French expatriate sportspeople in Cyprus
French expatriate sportspeople in England
Belgian Pro League players
Cypriot First Division players
Expatriate footballers in Cyprus
Expatriate footballers in England
Expatriate footballers in Belgium
Association football defenders
Footballers from Auvergne-Rhône-Alpes